Yellow passport may refer to:
Yellow ticket, prostitution permit in the Russian Empire
The Yellow Passport, American 1916 silent film  
Der gelbe Paß, a 1928 Russian-German coproduction film by Fedor Ozep
El pasaporte amarillo,
A 1915 novel by Joaquín Dicenta
A 2009 Chilean film directed by Raúl Ruiz